Sheldon is a village in Sheldon Township, Iroquois County, Illinois, United States. The population was 1,070 at the 2010 census, down from 1,232 at the 2000 census.

Geography
U.S. Route 24 runs along the northern edge of the village, leading west  to Watseka, the Iroquois county seat, and east  to Kentland, Indiana. U.S. Route 52 intersects US 24 along Sheldon's northern border, leading north  to Iroquois and east with US 24 into Indiana.

Demographics

At the 2000 census, there were 1,232 people, 464 households and 333 families residing in the village. The racial makeup of the village was 98.05% White, 0.41% African American, 0.08% Native American, 0.32% Asian, 0.16% from other races, and 0.97% from two or more races. Hispanic or Latino of any race were 1.14% of the population.

There were 464 households, of which 33.2% had children under the age of 18 living with them, 52.4% were married couples living together, 15.3% had a female householder with no husband present, and 28.2% were non-families. 23.5% of all households were made up of individuals, and 10.8% had someone living alone who was 65 years of age or older.  The average household size was 2.57 and the average family size was 2.98.

27.2% of the population were under the age of 18, 7.6% from 18 to 24, 26.9% from 25 to 44, 20.0% from 45 to 64, and 18.3% who were 65 years of age or older. The median age was 37 years. For every 100 females, there were 97.8 males. For every 100 females age 18 and over, there were 91.3 males.

The median household income was $35,463 and the median family income was $38,750. Males had a median income of $29,167 compared with $18,839 for females. The per capita income for the village was $15,627. About 8.0% of families and 10.7% of the population were below the poverty line, including 19.9% of those under age 18 and 6.0% of those age 65 or over.

References

Villages in Iroquois County, Illinois
Villages in Illinois